A. Eliason House is a historic home located at Mt. Pleasant, New Castle County, Delaware.  It was built about 1850, and is a three-story, five-bay, brick dwelling with a shallow hipped roof.  It has a center passage plan and features two one-story, tetra-style porches. Also on the property are a contributing two-story brick combination carriage house and storage loft, an earthfast cartshed, a braced frame granary containing corn cribs,
and a brick stable.

It was listed on the National Register of Historic Places in 1985.

References

Houses on the National Register of Historic Places in Delaware
Houses completed in 1850
Houses in New Castle County, Delaware
National Register of Historic Places in New Castle County, Delaware